Mera Jawab is a 1985 Indian film directed by N.S. Raj Bharath.

Cast
 Jackie Shroff as Suresh / Solanki Patwardhan Lal
 Meenakshi Sheshadri as Poonam
 Parikshit Sahni as Arun
 Kader Khan as Inspector Ajay
 Shakti Kapoor as Danny 
 Gulshan Grover as Kuku
 Shiva Rindani as Bunty
 Satyendra Kapoor as Dr. D'Souza

Soundtrack
Lyrics: Santosh Anand

External links

References

1980s Hindi-language films
1985 films
Films scored by Laxmikant–Pyarelal
Indian action films
1985 action films